Kuo Cheng-wei (born 12 June 1982) is a Taiwanese weightlifter. He competed in the men's lightweight event at the 2004 Summer Olympics.

References

1982 births
Living people
Taiwanese male weightlifters
Olympic weightlifters of Taiwan
Weightlifters at the 2004 Summer Olympics
Place of birth missing (living people)
Weightlifters at the 2002 Asian Games
Asian Games competitors for Chinese Taipei
21st-century Taiwanese people